Edoardo Moscatelli (20 December 1898 – 13 June 1963) was a sailor from Italy who represented his country at the 1928 Summer Olympics in Amsterdam, Netherlands.

References

Italian male sailors (sport)
Sailors at the 1928 Summer Olympics – 8 Metre
Olympic sailors of Italy
1898 births
1963 deaths